Nava Telangana is a daily Telugu language newspaper in the Indian state of Telangana owned by the Communist Party of India (Marxist) (CPI(M)). It is published in Karimnagar, Khammam, Hyderabad, and Ranga Reddy.

The party launched the newspaper on 21 March 2015 as a counterpart to their Andra Pradesh-based newspaper Prajasakti after the formation of Telangana the year prior. A ceremony was held t mark the launch with various political figures from "all political parties" in attendance. The paper recorded a drop of 67% in government advertising fees from the Telangana state government, a major source of newspaper funds, from 2016 to 2018.

See also
 
 List of newspapers in India
 List of newspapers in India by circulation
 List of newspapers in the world by circulation

References

External links
 Website

Daily newspapers published in India
Telugu-language newspapers
Newspapers published in Hyderabad
2015 establishments in Telangana
Publications established in 2015